"Falling Awake" a promotional single by Tarja from her third album What Lies Beneath, composed by herself and Johnny Andrews.
The single was released worldwide on 19 July by Universal Music, and had a limited release. The song was produced by Tarja, being her first single released produced by herself.

On August 24, it was released on iTunes.

Content

Track listing
 "Falling Awake" (Single Version) – 4:43
 "The Good Die Young" (Tarja Version) – 5:15

Guests
There are three different versions of the song that features a different guitarist for each one. Joe Satriani plays on the album version, Jason Hook of Five Finger Death Punch is featured on the single version, and Julian Barrett appears in the free download version.

Music video
A promotional video was released featuring behind the scenes studio footage of the making of What Lies Beneath.

Chart performance

References

2010 singles
Songs written by Johnny Andrews
Tarja Turunen songs
Songs written by Tarja Turunen
2010 songs